TeenNick India was a programming block on Nick Jr. India devoted to teens. It was part of Nickelodeon India. TeenNick India was discontinued on 1 February 2017.

History
Nickelodeon India does not air live action Nickelodeon programming on the main channel and decided to launch those shows as part of a night time programming block in 2012 on Nick Jr. India. Later, it started showing animated Nickelodeon programming like Teenage Mutant Ninja Turtles. Nick HD+ launched in 2015 also had some live action programming.

On 1 February 2017 the block was discontinued, making Nick Jr. a 24-hour channel. Nickelodeon HD+ also stopped airing live action programs from that date however they were again started from 2 August 2021.

Programming

Bella and the Bulldogs
Big Time Rush
Drake & Josh
The Haunted Hathaways
Game Shakers
Henry Danger
House of Anubis
iCarly
Marvin Marvin
Nicky, Ricky, Dicky & Dawn
The Penguins of Madagascar
Power Rangers Samurai
Sam & Cat
Shaun the Sheep
SpongeBob SquarePants
Supah Ninjas
Teenage Mutant Ninja Turtles
The Thundermans
The Troop
True Jackson, VP
Unfabulous
Victorious
Winx Club

References

External links
 Official Facebook page

Nickelodeon India
Television channels and stations established in 2012
Television channels and stations disestablished in 2017
Viacom 18
Television programming blocks in Asia
Defunct television channels in India
2012 establishments in Maharashtra
2017 disestablishments in India